Thutob Namgyal (Wylie: mthu-stobs rnam-rgyal) (1860 – 11 February 1914) was the ruling chogyal (monarch) of Sikkim between 1874 and 1914. Thutob ascended to the throne succeeding his half-brother Sidkeong Namgyal who died issueless. Differences between the Nepalese settlers and the indigenous population during his reign led to the direct intervention of the British, who were the de facto rulers of the Himalayan nation. The British ruled in favour of the Nepalese much to the discontent of the chogyal, who then retreated to the Chumbi Valley and allied himself with the Tibetans.

The British sent a military force (Sikkim expedition), and after a series of skirmishes between the Tibetans and the British near Jelep La, the Tibetans were pushed back and the Chogyal was put under the supervision of John Claude White, who had been appointed Political Officer in 1889. In 1894, he shifted the capital from Tumlong to the present location, Gangtok. He was knighted in 1911. Alex McKay states, "The 9th Chogyal of Sikkim, Sir Thutob Namgyal, was increasingly supportive of modernisation. After his death in 1914, Sidkeon Namgyal Tulku, who had been groomed for the post by the British, succeeded him but died after ruling for just 10 months. Sidkeong Tulku’s younger half-brother, Tashi Namgyal, who had been educated at St Paul’s and Mayo College, then became Chogyal in 1915, and ruled Sikkim until his death in 1963."

The Sir Thutob Namgyal Memorial (STNM) Hospital in Gangtok was built in memory of him in 1917.

Titles
1860 – 1874: Prince Thutob Namgyal.
1874 – 1911: His Highness Sri Panch Maharaja Thutob Namgyal, Maharaja Chogyal of Sikkim.
1911 – 1914: His Highness Sri Panch Maharaja Sir Thutob Namgyal, Maharaja Chogyal of Sikkim, KCIE.

Honours
British Empire
KCIE: Knight Commander of the Order of the Indian Empire, 12 December 1911.
Empress of India Gold Medal, 1 January 1877. 
Delhi Durbar Gold Medal, 1 January 1903. 
Delhi Durbar Golf Medal, 11 December 1911.

References

19th-century Indian monarchs
20th-century Indian monarchs
Monarchs of Sikkim
1860 births
1914 deaths
Knights Commander of the Order of the Indian Empire